Novo-Pokrovskoye is a rural locality (a village) in Posyolok Zolotkovo, Gus-Khrustalny District, Vladimir Oblast, Russia. The population was 15 as of 2010.

Geography 
Karevo is the nearest rural locality.

References 

Rural localities in Gus-Khrustalny District